opened in Kagoshima, Japan, in 1983. The museum, located in the grounds of Tsurumaru Castle, exhibits materials relating to the history and culture of Kagoshima Prefecture.

See also
 List of Historic Sites of Japan (Kagoshima)

References

Museums in Kagoshima Prefecture
Museums established in 1983
1983 establishments in Japan
Buildings and structures in Kagoshima
History museums in Japan
Prefectural museums